Carolina Sepúlveda is a Colombian model and actress. She was born in Cúcuta, Colombia. Her television debut was as María in the drama series La viuda de la mafia. Her most notable performance on television has been in Sin senos no hay paraíso, and Sin senos sí hay paraíso as Ximena.

Filmography

References

External links 
 

Living people
Colombian telenovela actresses
Colombian television actresses
People from Cúcuta
21st-century Colombian actresses
Year of birth missing (living people)